Heli Air is a British light helicopter company and a distributor of Robinson helicopters.  The company slogan is Helicopters Nationwide.

Services

The company provides:
 Helicopter Training and Helicopter selection
 Helicopter Purchase assistance
 Basic Helicopter Training 
 Advanced Helicopter Training
 Helicopter Management

Operating bases 
Heli Air currently operates from 4 bases nationwide; Cumbernauld, Gloucestershire, Wycombe, and Wellesbourne.

Cumbernauld is operated by Heli Air Scotland Limited, a Scottish registered company.

In 2016 Heli Air operated 9 bases at one time. Bases now closed; Silverstone, Denham, Fairoaks, Manchester, Thruxton.

References

External links
 

Airlines established in 1986
Helicopter airlines
Airlines of the United Kingdom
Companies based in Warwickshire